The first season of the American animated television series Superjail!, created by Christy Karacas, Stephen Warbrick, and Ben Gruber, originally aired on Adult Swim in the United States. The season premiered on September 28, 2008 and ended on December 7, 2008.

The first season was the only season of the show to be produced by Augenblick Studios.

Cast

Main cast
 David Wain as the Warden
 Teddy Cohn as Jared
 Christy Karacas as Alice
 Christopher McCulloch as various characters
 Christy Karacas as Jacknife

Recurring characters

Also starring
 Richard Mather as the Twins (7 episodes)
 Stephen Warbrick as Jean Baptiste Le Ghei (6 episodes)

Guest starring
 Sally Donovan as the Mistress (1 episode)
 Tim Harrington as live-action Warden (1 episode)

Episodes

Reception and release

Critical reception
DVD Verdict's David Johnson criticized the season in his review of the DVD release, calling it a "massive disappointment". He found the violence "grows tedious and you will be desensitized and the dearth of functional humor will hit you even harder." Ian Jane of DVD Talk gave the release four stars out of five, praising the humor and creativity, "so long as your sense of humor runs towards the more perverse side and you appreciate black comedy." He recommended the season be enjoyed "in two or three episode jolts", and that the detailed backgrounds and animation gave the season a "considerable" amount of replay value. Blogcritics's Greg Barbrick praised the release as "a must" for "anyone who enjoys truly twisted animation". He highlighted the episodes "Terrorarium" and "Time-Police" as "positively lysergic" examples of the season, but found the bleeping of profanity on the set surprising contrasted with the graphic violence.

Home media
Warner Home Video published a DVD release of the season for region 1 markets on February 23, 2010. A region 2 DVD had been released on March 12 of the same year. In promoting the release, Vice magazine held a contest with readers to submit fan art, judged by series creator Christy Karacas, with two winners receiving unopened copies of the release. The season has also been made available for digital download through the iTunes Store, with a single volume released on September 28, 2008.

Notes

References

2008 American television seasons